Max Colli (born 5 December 1915, date of death unknown) was an Austrian rower. He competed in the men's coxless pair event at the 1936 Summer Olympics.

References

External links
 

1915 births
Year of death missing
Austrian male rowers
Olympic rowers of Austria
Rowers at the 1936 Summer Olympics
Place of birth missing